Aliaksei Alfiorau (born 23 February 2000) is a Belarusian boxer. He participated at the 2021 AIBA World Boxing Championships, being awarded the silver medal in the light heavyweight event. In the final match, Alfiorau was defeated by Robby Gonzales.

References

External links 

2000 births
Living people
Place of birth missing (living people)
Belarusian male boxers
Light-heavyweight boxers
AIBA World Boxing Championships medalists
21st-century Belarusian people